Lee Gyu-chang (born 18 February 1972) is a South Korean handball player. He competed in the men's tournament at the 1992 Summer Olympics.

References

1972 births
Living people
South Korean male handball players
Olympic handball players of South Korea
Handball players at the 1992 Summer Olympics
Place of birth missing (living people)
20th-century South Korean people